The Six Arrows (Turkish: Altı Ok) is the symbol and flag of the Turkish Republican People's Party (CHP). The arrows represent the fundamental pillars of Kemalism, Turkey's founding ideology. These are Republicanism, Populism, Nationalism, Laicism, Statism, and Revolutionalism. The arrows are believed to have been conceived by İsmail Hakkı Tonguç, a Turkish scientist who made significant contributions to the Turkish education system. The principles of the Six Arrows were added to the Turkish Constitution on 5 February 1937. From August 1938 the flag was hoisted at all official buildings.

See also
Arrow Cross
Arrow (symbol)
Three Arrows
Circassian flag
Three Principles of the People
Pancasila (politics)
Yoke and arrows

References

Kemalism
Political flags
Political symbols
Republican People's Party (Turkey)
State ideologies